In Gallo-Roman religion, Segomo ("victor, mighty one") was a war god worshipped in Gaul. In Roman times he was equated with Mars and Hercules. He may be related to Cocidius, a similar god worshipped in Britain. The name of the legendary High King of Ireland Nia Segamain, which translates as "sister's son or champion of Segamon", may be related.

References

Gaulish gods
War gods